A serif is a decorative detail on letters and other typographical symbols.

Serif may also refer to:
 Şərif, a municipality in Balakan Rayon, Azerbaijan
 Serif Europe, a software company specialising in creative software
 Serif DrawPlus, a vector graphics editor
 Serif PagePlus, a desk-top publishing program
 Seraph, Character featured in "The Matrix Reloaded"
 Şerif, Turkish name
 Serif (publisher), an Independent publishing company based in London
 San Serriffe, a typographical hoax.

See also
 Sans-serif